Fuchsberger is a German surname and may refer to:
 Franz Fuchsberger (1910–1992), Austrian footballer
 Fuxi Fuchsberger, Austrian skier
 Joachim Fuchsberger (1927–2014), German actor, television host, lyricist and businessman
 Sebastian Fuchsberger (born 1971), Austrian musician

German-language surnames